Charles Wakefield (13 April 1900 – 18 January 1969) was a South African cricketer. He played in two first-class matches for Border in 1920/21.

See also
 List of Border representative cricketers

References

External links
 

1900 births
1969 deaths
South African cricketers
Border cricketers
Cricketers from East London, Eastern Cape